Robert "Choc" Thornton (born 14 July 1978 in Darlington) is a retired English National Hunt jockey.

Robert "Chocolate" Thornton (known as Choc) was one of the United Kingdom's leading National Hunt jockeys. After growing up riding hunters with his father (a noted professional Huntsman) he started working for trainer David Nicholson in 1997 as an amateur and after immediate success became a Conditional jockey riding 71 winners during his first season in the sport. He won the Conditional Jockey's title the following year.

After making his professional debut, Thornton’s performance was consistent, if unspectacular, and he consistently featured in the top 10 of the British Jumps Jockey Championship. Thornton’s most successful season was the 2007/2008-season, during which he broke the 100-winner barrier for the first time, by winning 105 of his 597 races.
Robert Thornton shies away from the spotlight and he did not talk to the television cameras until he spoke to his owners and trainer.

Robert Thornton’s greatest achievements are all linked to the Cheltenham Festival, at which he showed a knack for riding winners in major hurdles races.  Thornton won his first Cheltenham Festival feature race in 2006, when he rode My Way de Solzen to victory in the World Hurdle.

Thornton has since won the Champion Hurdle and Triumph Hurdle. He also achieved good results in some of the Cheltenham Festival’s most prestigious chases, winning the Queen Mother Champion Chase on Voy Por Ustedes in 2007, and the Arkle Challenge Trophy in the same year. Thornton won the Top Jockey title at the Cheltenham Festival in 2007, by riding 4 winners during the meeting. In 2008 he rode three winners including a notable 1st day double. Thornton rode his 1,000th career winner on Araldur at Towcester on 28 March 2011.

He is unrelated to the jockey Andrew Thornton.

His worst moment in racing was when Strong Promise died in the 2000 Martel Cup at Liverpool.

Cheltenham Festival Winners

See also
 List of jockeys

References

1978 births
English jockeys
Lester Award winners
Living people